Tim O'Connor (born 13 September 1981) is an Australian theatre director, producer and playwright.

Career 
When O'Connor finished school he volunteered in the office at Harvest Rain Theatre Company for three years. He was eventually employed and became more involved in administrative work. His first paid directors role was for a community play for Harvest Rain . 

When the opportunity arose he took over the role of running Harvest Rain.

Since 2004, O'Connor was the Artistic Director of the Harvest Rain Theatre Company and subsequently became the CEO.  However, as of December 2022, Harvest Rain Theatre Company (now rebranded as AVT Live) is reported as closed.

In an interview with Katherine Sullivan, O'Connor said... when I was coming up the ranks, so many people told me I’d never make it, ... But I say just because something hasn't been done doesn't mean it can't be done. If you want it badly enough, you’ll find a way. Directing and producing are tricky and challenging, but if you’re passionate and curious about it, follow that curiosity. He has directed Australian productions of musicals such as Jesus Christ Superstar, Hairspray, Oklahoma!, and Spamalot, as well as for writing, directing, and producing the world premiere stage adaptation of The Neverending Story.

In 2013, he announced that the Harvest Rain Theatre Company would become Queensland's first professional musical theatre company, which involved payment to the lead actors who were often well-established professionals supported by its "internship program, donors, sponsors and ticket sales."

Training programs 
O'Connor is the founder of the Brisbane Academy of Musical Theatre.

Harvest Rain also ran the Australian Musical Theatre Workshop which hosted workshops and masterclasses in Brisbane and regional centres,

Awards 
In 2011, O'Connor won a Groundling Award for Outstanding Contribution to the Queensland Theatre Industry. In 2012 he was nominated for Brisbane's person of the year. In 2014, he won a Gold Matilda Award for his work with Harvest Rain and was also nominated for Best Director for Spamalot.

References

Australian theatre directors
Australian theatre managers and producers
1981 births
Living people